Numan, also known as Nomweh (meaning 'hilltop'), is a town and a Local Government Area in Adamawa State, Nigeria. It is a port town that lies on the confluence of Benue River and Gongola River.

The predominant ethnic group in the town are the Bwatiye (Bachama) people who have a reputation of being unconquered warriors in all their history. The Bwatiye people are led by a First Class King known as the Hama Bachama, who is the paramount ruler of the Bachama Kingdom, whose Voti (palace) is in Numan the administrative seat of the throne while Lamurde has another palace for the King as that is the spiritual or ancestral home of the Bwatiye people. The name of the current King is Homun (King) Dr Daniel Ismaila Shaga OON, who ascended the throne in 2020 . The Queen of the Bachama kingdom is referred to as Mbamto (Queen) and she is Mbamto Rosaline Daniel Ismaila Shaga.They Currently Have Four Children Whose Names Aren’t Identified Yet

The town is the location of Adamawa State Polytechnic.

References

Gen. Muhammad Almustapha Musa @ New Motor Park, Numan Nigeria (11 April 2021).

Local Government Areas in Adamawa State